Same-sex marriage in Scotland has been legal since 16 December 2014. As family law is not reserved to the Parliament of the United Kingdom, the Scottish Parliament has legislative competence to make changes to the law on marriage. A same-sex marriage law was approved by the Scottish Parliament in February 2014 and received royal assent on 12 March 2014. It came into effect on 16 December with many civil partners converting their relationships into marriages, while the first same-sex marriage ceremonies occurred on 31 December 2014. Civil partnerships for same-sex couples have been legal in Scotland since 2005.

Civil partnerships

Civil partnerships have been recognised for same-sex couples in Scotland since 2005 following the enactment of the Civil Partnership Act 2004. The Act gives same-sex couples most (but not all) of the rights and responsibilities of civil marriage. Civil partners are entitled to the same property rights as married opposite-sex couples, the same exemption as married couples on inheritance tax, social security and pension benefits, and also the ability to get parental responsibility for a partner's children, as well as responsibility for reasonable maintenance of one's partner and their children, tenancy rights, full life insurance recognition, next of kin rights in hospitals, and others. There is a formal process for dissolving partnerships akin to divorce.

The legalisation of same-sex marriage in Scotland has had several notable impacts on legislation relating to Scottish civil partnerships. The Scottish Government has elected to introduce:
Possible tests for religious and belief bodies to meet when solemnising marriages or registering civil partnerships, in light of increasing concerns over sham and forced marriages.
Religious and belief ceremonies to register civil partnerships.

Since November 2015, civil partnerships originating elsewhere in the United Kingdom other than Scotland (including Northern Ireland) can be converted to a marriage without the couple being forced to dissolve the civil partnership. In June 2020, the Scottish Parliament passed legislation opening civil partnerships to different-sex couples.

Statistics
According to the National Records of Scotland, 5,913 civil partnerships were registered in Scotland between 2005 and 2021. By Scottish council area, most same-sex partnerships were performed in the City of Edinburgh (1,528), followed by Glasgow City (1,148), Dumfries and Galloway (599), Fife (273), Highland (213), Aberdeen City (191), Argyll and Bute (152), Perth and Kinross (150), Dundee City (138), South Lanarkshire (119), Stirling (116), Aberdeenshire (113), the Scottish Borders (111), North Ayrshire (106), South Ayrshire (98) and West Lothian (98), North Lanarkshire (93), East Lothian (92), Falkirk (81), Renfrewshire (69), Moray (59), Midlothian (53) and Angus (53), West Dunbartonshire (51), East Dunbartonshire (48), East Ayrshire (43), East Renfrewshire (42), Clackmannanshire (33), Inverclyde (27), the Orkney Islands (7) and the Shetland Islands (7), and Na h-Eileanan Siar (2).

Same-sex marriage

Petition
In January 2009, a petition was drawn up by Nick Henderson, director of the LGBT Network, to be submitted to the Scottish Parliament. The petition called for a change to the law that disallowed two people of the same sex from getting married, by amending the Marriage (Scotland) Act 1977. The petition also called for allowing same-sex marriage ceremonies to be performed by faith groups, but only if the religious institution gives consent. As well as political support from the leader of the Labour Party in the European Parliament, Glenis Willmott, and MEP and veteran gay rights activist Michael Cashman, the petition drew the signatures and support of Celia Kitzinger and Sue Wilkinson and of eight church leaders, both of the Scottish Episcopal Church and the Church of Scotland. The Very Reverend Kelvin Holdsworth, provost of St Mary's Cathedral in Glasgow, has often spoken of his willingness and desire to perform valid same-sex marriages in his church, and was a key supporter of the petition. It also attracted high-profile support from Labour MSP George Foulkes. The petition closed on 6 March, having gathered 1,007 signatures.

On 17 March 2009, the Public Petitions Committee unanimously agreed to question the Scottish Government on whether and when it planned to amend the Marriage (Scotland) Act 1977 to allow same-sex marriages. They also requested that a reason be provided if an amendment could not be considered.

In March 2009, shortly before submission of the LGBT Network's petition to the Scottish Parliament, the National Union of Students Scotland established an "Equal Marriage Campaign", launching a similar petition to the Scottish Parliament and calling for the amendment of legislation to allow same-sex marriage and mixed-sex civil partnerships in Scotland, although the petition itself did not distinguish between civil and religious marriage. This campaign attracted the support of a number of MSPs and MEPs, as well as activist organisations and individuals. The petition closed on 1 September 2009, having gathered 1,317 signatures. On 8 September, the Public Petitions Committee convened after a summer recess, and agreed to contact the government seeking responses to specific points raised in both petitions and the discussion.

On 1 December 2009, the Public Petitions Committee decided to seek a meeting between a government minister and the petitioners, as well as enquire as to whether the government might consider setting up an advisory committee of interested parties. The government rejected the petition, as legalising same-sex marriage in Scotland only would require changes in non-devolved matters such as the areas of immigration, pensions and inheritance law all of which would have to be done at national level. The head of the government's equality unit, Hilary Third, said that although from an equality point of view "equal marriage is where we want to be" it would be a "difficult situation" if same-sex marriage was legal in Scotland but not in England. In 2011, Her Majesty's Government announced a consultation on the legalisation of same-sex marriage in England and Wales would be held, and it began in March 2012.

Consultation
From September to December 2011, the Scottish Government held a consultation on the issue after the Scottish Social Attitudes Survey found 60% of Scots to be in favour of legalising same-sex marriages in Scotland. The consultation offered consideration on both removing religious prohibitions for civil partnerships and also legalising same-sex marriage. In the foreword to the consultation document, Deputy First Minister Nicola Sturgeon stated:"The Scottish Government is choosing to make its initial views clear at the outset of this consultation. We tend towards the view that religious ceremonies for civil partnerships should no longer be prohibited and that same-sex marriage should be introduced so that same-sex couples have the option of getting married if that is how they wish to demonstrate their commitment to each other. We also believe that no religious body or its celebrants should be required to carry out same-sex marriages or civil partnership ceremonies."

Unlike the English and Welsh consultation, the one for Scotland dealt with the issue of same-sex marriage in a religious context. On 10 December 2011, The Scotsman newspaper reported that some 50,000 responses had been received from within Scotland. In reality, when counting was finished, the total stood at 77,508. The government presented the results and analysis of the consultation in July 2012. Respondents who opposed the introduction of same-sex marriage were in the majority, with 67%. However, 14,869 (19%) of responses came from outside of Scotland and 26,383 (34%) were submitted by a pre-printed postcard rather than via the proper consultation form.

Legislation

On 25 July 2012, the Scottish Government announced it would bring forward legislation to legalise both civil and religious same-sex marriage in Scotland. It reiterated its intention to ensure that no religious group or individual member of the clergy would be forced to conduct such ceremonies; it also stated its intention to work with Westminster to make necessary changes to the Equality Act 2010 to ensure that this would be guaranteed.

On 27 June 2013, the Scottish Government introduced the Marriage and Civil Partnerships (Scotland) Bill to the Scottish Parliament. LGBT rights campaigners, celebrating outside the UK Parliament on 15 July 2013 for the clearance of the Marriage (Same Sex Couples) Act 2013 in the House of Lords, declared that they would continue the campaign to extend same-sex marriage rights to both Scotland and Northern Ireland. A majority of members of the Scottish Parliament had declared their support for same-sex marriage, including the then leader of each party in Parliament: Alex Salmond (Scottish National Party (SNP); then First Minister of Scotland), Johann Lamont (Labour), Ruth Davidson (Conservative), Willie Rennie (Liberal Democrats) and Patrick Harvie (Green).

The bill was fast-tracked through the Scottish Parliament with the aim of achieving royal assent for the legislation by March 2014. The Equal Opportunities Committee considered the bill from 5 September to 7 November, with a report published on 8 November. On 20 November, the bill passed its first stage with a 98 to 15 vote and five abstentions. Of the 98 MSPs that voted "yes" on the bill, 52 were members of the SNP, 31 were members of the Labour Party, seven were members of the Conservative Party, four were members of the Liberal Democrats, two were members of the Green Party, and two were independents. Of the 15 MSPs that voted "no" on the bill, 6 were members of the Scottish National Party, 8 were members of the Conservative Party, and one was a member of the Labour Party. Of the five MSPs who abstained, two were members of the SNP, and three were members of the Labour Party.

The bill returned to the Equal Opportunities Committee for its second stage. The Committee considered the bill on 19 December 2013, rejecting several amendments proposed by opponents of the legislation. The Committee continued the second stage on 16 January 2014. The final stage debate and vote was held on 4 February 2014. The bill was approved with 105 MSPs in favour and 18 opposed, with no abstentions. It received royal assent by Queen Elizabeth II on 12 March as the Marriage and Civil Partnership (Scotland) Act 2014, and came into effect on 16 December. Civil partners began converting their relationships into marriages on that date, and the first same-sex marriages occurred on 31 December 2014. The first same-sex couple to marry in Scotland were Susan and Gerrie Douglas-Scott on 31 December in Glasgow, with sixteen other same-sex couples marrying across Scotland later that same day.

Statistics
462 same-sex marriages were performed in Scotland in the first five months after the law came into force, accounting for 12% of all marriages performed during that time.

Statistics published by the National Records of Scotland showed that 1,671 same-sex marriages took place in Scotland in 2015. Of these, 935 were conversions from existing civil partnerships and 736 were new marriages. In 2016, there were 998 same-sex marriages, representing about 3.4% of the total 29,229 marriages performed in Scotland that year.

Figures for 2020 are much lower than previous years because of the restrictions in place due to the COVID-19 pandemic.

Religious performance
In June 2016, the Scottish Episcopal Church became the first British province in the Anglican Communion to take steps to allow same-sex marriages to be performed in their churches. The General Synod voted in favour of a motion to begin discussion amongst the seven dioceses to remove the doctrinal clause which stated that marriage was between a man and a woman. The vote received support from five of seven bishops, 69% of the clergy and 80% of the laity. The General Synod formally approved the change to the doctrinal clause in June 2017, removing language stating that marriages could only be between a man and a woman and introducing a new conscience clause which allows clergy to opt out of performing same-sex weddings. On 20 July 2017, it was announced that a same-sex wedding was to be held at St Mary's Cathedral in Glasgow later in the summer. On 1 August 2017, a same-sex marriage, which included the Eucharist as a nuptial mass, was held at the Church of St John the Evangelist in Edinburgh. The Scottish Episcopal Church is estimated to have 100,000 members, and offers same-sex marriage to other Anglicans, including members of churches in England and the United States.

In May 2018, the Church of Scotland voted to draft new laws that would allow ministers to conduct same-sex marriages. The motion was passed by the General Assembly by a vote of 345 to 170. The legal questions committee had two years to draft legislation. In May 2021, the General Assembly voted 319–217 to approve the draft legislation. The law includes safeguards for ministers opposed to performing same-sex marriages. The presbyteries voted 29–12 in support of the legislation in April, and the General Assembly gave its final approval on 23 May 2022 by 274 votes to 136. Reverend Scott Rennie, the minister of Queen's Cross Church in Aberdeen, welcomed the move, saying, "My marriage to my husband, Dave, nurtures my life and my ministry, and frankly I do not think I could be a minister of this church without his love and support. It is always there in the background. Same-sex marriage is like opposite-sex marriage and it has its joys and sorrows, its glories and its tensions. It’s pretty normal, really."

Some smaller religious organisations also perform same-sex marriages in their places of worship, including the United Reformed Church, Quakers, Reform Jews, Liberal Jews, and the Scottish Pagan Federation.

Public opinion
A 2014 opinion poll published by the Scottish Social Attitudes Survey showed that 68% of Scottish people supported same-sex marriage, while 17% opposed. Support was higher among young people (83%) than among people over 65 (44%), higher among women (72%) than men (63%), and higher among atheists or irreligious people (81%) than among Catholics (60%) or Church of Scotland adherents (59%).

See also

 LGBT rights in Scotland
 Same-sex marriage in the United Kingdom
 Recognition of same-sex unions in the British Overseas Territories
 Recognition of same-sex unions in Europe

Notes

References

2014 establishments in Scotland
Scotland
LGBT rights in Scotland
Marriage, unions and partnerships in Scotland
2014 in LGBT history